The Challis Professorship are professorships at the University of Sydney named in honour of John Henry Challis, an Anglo-Australian merchant, landowner and philanthropist, whose bequests to the University of Sydney allowed for their establishment.

In 1880 John Henry Challis bequeathed residuary real and personal estate to the University, "to be applied for the benefit of that Institution in such manner as the governing body thereof shall direct". From the income of the Fund a sum of £7,500 was applied for the payment of half the cost of the erection of a new Chemical Laboratory, and a further sum of £1,900 devoted to the erection of a marble statue of Mr Challis, which has been placed in the Great Hall, opposite to that of Mr W. C. Wentworth. The Challis appointments were then created.

Holders

English
 John Le Gay Brereton (1921-1933)
 A.J.A. Waldock (1934–50)
 Wesley Milgate (1951–61)
 Sam L. Goldberg (1963–66)
 Gerry Wilkes (1966–96)
 Margaret Harris (2006–07)
Paul Giles (2010–)

Philosophy
 Francis Anderson (1890-1921)
 John Anderson (1927-1958)
 J. L. Mackie (1959-1963)
 David Malet Armstrong (1964-1991)
 Keith Campbell
 Huw Price (2002-2012)
 Moira Gatens (2012- )
Bernard Muscio is missing from the list and fits between Francis and John Anderson.

History
 George Arnold Wood (1891-1928)
 Stephen Henry Roberts (1929-1947)
 John Manning Ward (1948-1979)
 Deryck M. Schreuder (1980-1992)
 Ros Pesman (2003-?2004) 
 Stephen Garton (?2004-???)
 Shane White (???- )
 Christopher Hilliard, 2022-

Law
 Pitt Cobbett (1890-1909)
 John Peden (1910-?1941?)
 James Williams (1942-?1946?)
 Kenneth Owen Shatwell (1947-1974)
 William Loutit Morison (1982-1985)
 Ross Waite Parsons (1986)

 David Harland (1989-2001)
 Richard Vann (2002?-)

International Law and Jurisprudence (split)
This chair appears to have been the fourth of its kind in the English-speaking world. Its predecessors were the Regius Chair of Public Law and the Law of Nature and Nations at the University of Edinburgh; the Chair of Jurisprudence and the Law of Nations at UCL; and the Chair of Jurisprudence and International Law at Trinity College, Dublin. It was split after Stone's retirement into two separate chairs.

 Archibald Hamilton Charteris (1920-1940) 
 Julius Stone (1942-1973)

International Law
 David Johnson (1976-1985)
 James Crawford (1986-1992)
 Ivan Shearer (1993-2003)
 Donald Rothwell (2004-2006)
 Gillian Triggs (2010-2012)
 Ben Saul (2016-)

Jurisprudence
 Alice Erh-Soon Tay (1975-2002)

 Wojciech Sadurski (2009- )

Anatomy
 James Thomas Wilson (1890-1920)
 John Irvine Hunter (1923-1924)
 Arthur Neville Burkitt (1926-1955)
 Neil William Macintosh (1955-1973)
 Michael J. Blunt (1973-1984)
 Jonathan Stone (1987-2003)

Biology
It returned to its original name in 1963.
 William Aitcheson Haswell (1890-1917)
 Launcelot Harrison (1922-1928) 
 William John Dakin (1929-1948)
 Patrick Desmond Fitzgerald Murray (1949-1960)
 Charles Birch (1960-1983)
 Donald Thomas Anderson
 Norman Alan Walker (1992-1993)
 Ian Douglas Hume 
 Ronald Anthony Skurray

Civil Engineering
 William Henry Warren (29 July 1889-?1925)
 Launcelot Harrison
 Jack William Roderick
 John Carter
 Nicholas S. Trahair
 Kim Rasmussen (2009 - )

See also
List of University of Sydney people

Notes

References

External links
 http://gutenberg.net.au/ebooks15/1500721h/0-dict-biogCa-Ch.html#challis1
 http://adb.anu.edu.au/biography/challis-john-henry-3186

University of Sydney